Organized crime was particularly active in its heyday of the 1950s.  The year 1951 saw a number of notable organized crime events, including the conviction of mobster Mickey Cohen for tax evasion.

Events
New York mobster Mickey Cohen, a rival of Los Angeles syndicate boss Jack Dragna, is convicted of income tax evasion.   
April 16 – Sam Maceo, former underboss of the Texas crime syndicate, dies of natural causes while at a hospital in Baltimore, Maryland.
April 19 – Shortly after the disappearance of Vincent Mangano (who, according to underworld lore, was murdered and buried in the concrete foundation of a housing project owned by Anastasia), New York mobster Philip Mangano is found dead in a marsh near Jamaica Bay. Former Mangano lieutenant Albert Anastasia, backed by Frank Costello, takes over the family after Mangano's murder. Although Anastasia, Joe Adonis and Frank Costello are questioned in connection with the incident, no charges are filed. Before their deaths, the Mangano brothers had controlled the New York waterfront for nearly two decades since the murders of Alfred Mineo and Steve Ferrigno in 1930 during the Castellammarese War.
New York mobster Thomas Gagliano, leader of the present day Lucchese crime family, goes into semi-retirement and leaves day-to-day activities of the Family to Acting Boss Thomas Lucchese.
May 28 – Joe Adonis is convicted for gambling violations and sentenced to two years in New Jersey State Prison.  
August 6 – Tony Brancato and Tony Trombino, known as the "Two Tony's", are found shot to death in the front seat of an abandoned car in Los Angeles. Both Brancato and Trombino had been identified robbing a syndicate-controlled Nevada hotel.
September 8 – Meyer Lansky is charged with operating illegal gambling in Saratoga Springs, New York.
October 4 – New Jersey mobster Willie Moretti is killed by four unidentified gunman while at a restaurant in Cliffside Park, New Jersey.
October 20 – The Revenue Act of 1951 is officially signed into law, which would becoming effective November 1, establishing wagering excise and occupational taxes. Although later declared unconstitutional by the Supreme Court in 1968, the statute forced many leading bookmakers to move their respective gambling operations out of the United States for several years.
November 20 – After decades of corruption, New York Governor Thomas E. Dewey orders the New York State Crime Commission to conduct an investigation of the New York waterfront.

Arts and literature
The Enforcer (film)  starring Humphrey Bogart.
The Glenrowan Affair (film)

Births
Dennis Allen "Dr. Death", Melbourne based drug dealer and murderer.
April – Cesare Bonventre, Bonanno-Galante crime family captain. 
May 27 – Michael Franzese, member of the Colombo crime family.
June – Keith Faure, Melbourne crime figure.
June 30 – Salvatore LoCascio, high-ranking member of the Gambino crime family.

Deaths
April – Philip Mangano, New York mobster and waterfront labor racketeer 
April 19 – Vincent Mangano, New York mobster and waterfront labor racketeer
April 16 – Sam Maceo, Texas crime syndicate underboss  
August 6 – Tony Brancato, Kansas City mobster 
August 6 – Tony Trombino, New York mobster
October 31 – Kierstin Powers, New York Mobster

References

Organized crime
Years in organized crime